Lascăr Pană Sports Hall is an indoor arena in Baia Mare, Romania and is the home ground of sports clubs from Baia Mare.

References

Sport in Baia Mare
Indoor arenas in Romania
Buildings and structures in Maramureș County
Handball venues in Romania